On either side of the posterior median sulcus of the spinal cord, and at a short distance from it, the posterior nerve roots are attached along a vertical furrow named the posterolateral sulcus. The portion of the medulla spinalis which lies between this and the posterior median sulcus is named the posterior funiculus.

References

External links
 

Spinal cord